Jean N'Guessan may refer to:
 Jean Claude N'Guessan, Ivorian judoka
 Jean N'Guessan (footballer), Ivorian footballer